In Again, Out Again is a 1917 American silent comedy film directed by John Emerson and written by Anita Loos. The film stars Douglas Fairbanks, Arline Pretty, Walter Walker, Arnold Lucy, Helen Greene, Homer Hunt, and Albert Parker. The film was released on April 30, 1917, by Artcraft Pictures.

Plot
A young man drowns his sorrows in strong drink when jilted by his girl. His drunkenness gets him thrown in jail, where he falls in love with the jailer's daughter. When released, the young man tries everything to get back into the jail - though when he is mistaken for an anarchist bomber, he finds himself facing not just jail, but execution.

Cast
Douglas Fairbanks as Teddy Rutherford
Arline Pretty as Janie Dubb
Walter Walker as Sheriff Dubb 
Arnold Lucy as Amos Jennings
Helen Greene as Pacifica Jennings
Homer Hunt as Henry Pinchit
Albert Parker as Jerry
Bull Montana as Quenton Auburn
Ada Gilman as Teddy's Mother
Frank Lalor as Pinkie
Betty Tyrel as The Nurse
W. C. Robinson as The Trustee
Erich von Stroheim as Officer (uncredited)

Preservation status
A print of In Again, Out Again is preserved by the Museum of Modern Art, New York.

References

External links 

1917 films
1910s English-language films
Silent American comedy films
1917 comedy films
Paramount Pictures films
Films directed by John Emerson
American black-and-white films
American silent feature films
1910s American films